John Tatoulis is an Australian film and television producer and director.

Tatoulis was the producer of such movies as Take Away, Let's Get Skase and Beware of Greeks Bearing Guns. Tatoulis produced and directed the film The Silver Brumby and later television series The Silver Brumby, which won the Children’s Jury – Best Feature Film award at the 1994 Chicago International Children's Film Festival and Adventures on Kythera. He also produced the animated television series The New Adventures of Ocean Girl.

Select Credits
In Too Deep (1989)
Beware of Greeks Bearing Guns (2000)

References

External links

Australian film directors
Australian film producers
Australian television producers
Australian people of Greek descent
Living people
Year of birth missing (living people)